Munit may be,

Munit language
Munit Mesfin